Going Home is a play by Australian author Alma De Groen. It premiered in 1976 by the Melbourne Theatre Company.

1980 TV Version

It was filmed by the ABC in a production by Alan Burke and directed by Michael Carson as part of the Australian Theatre Festival. Graeme Blundell and Gary Day starred.

Cast
Graeme Blundell as Jim
Gary Day as Mike
Tom Falk
Jill Howard as Zoe
Carole Skinner as Molly

External links
Going Home at Screen Australia
Original play at Austlit
Going Home 1980 TV film at IMDb
Theatre productions of Going Home at Ausstage

Australian television plays
Australian plays
1976 plays